Afonso Pena / Tijuca Station is a subway station on the Rio de Janeiro Metro that services the neighbourhood of Tijuca in the North Zone of Rio de Janeiro.

References

Metrô Rio stations
Railway stations opened in 1982
1982 establishments in Brazil